Ranheim Fotball is a Norwegian football club from Ranheim in Trondheim that currently plays in 1. divisjon, the second tier in the Norwegian football league system. Ranheim is the football department of Ranheim IL, founded on 17 February 1901.

History
In early years, Ranheim played in the Norwegian top flight in the seasons; 1937–38, 1938–39, 1939–40 and 1947–48, as well as in the seasons; 1949–50, 1952–53, 1954–55 and 1955–56.

Since 2006, Ranheim has acted as a farm club for Rosenborg, where the goal has been to establish a football team from Trøndelag in the 1. divisjon. Ranheim came close to qualifying in 2007 and 2008. Former manager Per Joar Hansen earned Ranheim a promotion to the 1. divisjon after the 2009 season. They played their first 6 home matches at Abrahallen, and on 10 July 2010, they moved to their new stadium, EXTRA Arena. Ranheim finished 5th in the 2010 1. divisjon and qualified for the promotion play-offs for a place in the Tippeligaen.

In the 2017 season, Ranheim gained promotion to the top level for the first time since 1955–56 after beating Sogndal. Over two legs, they first lost 1–0 away and went on to win 1–0 at home. After two scoreless periods of extra time they secured promotion by winning 5–4 on penalties. Ranheim finished the 2018 season in 7th place, and head coach Svein Maalen received the Eliteserien Coach of the Year award for this accomplishment. In the following 2019 season, the club finished 16th and last and were relegated.

Current squad

For season transfers, see transfers winter 2022–23 and transfers summer 2023.

Coaching staff

Administrative staff

Recent history
{|class="wikitable"
|-bgcolor="#efefef"
! Season
! 
! Pos.
! Pl.
! W
! D
! L
! GS
! GA
! P
!Cup
!Notes
|-
|2001
|2. divisjon
|align=right bgcolor="#FFCCCC"| 14
|align=right|26||align=right|6||align=right|2||align=right|18
|align=right|37||align=right|68||align=right|20
|Second round
|Relegated to the 3. divisjon
|-
|2002
|3. divisjon
|align=right |3
|align=right|22||align=right|14||align=right|3||align=right|5
|align=right|73||align=right|25||align=right|45
|Second round
|
|-
|2003
|3. divisjon
|align=right |2
|align=right|22||align=right|18||align=right|2||align=right|2
|align=right|100||align=right|31||align=right|56
|First round
|
|-
|2004
|3. divisjon
|align=right bgcolor=#DDFFDD| 1
|align=right|22||align=right|20||align=right|0||align=right|2
|align=right|110||align=right|20||align=right|60
|Second qualifying round
|Promoted to the 2. divisjon
|-
|2005
|2. divisjon
|align=right |8
|align=right|26||align=right|11||align=right|5||align=right|10
|align=right|63||align=right|54||align=right|38
|Second round
|
|-
|2006
|2. divisjon
|align=right |3
|align=right|26||align=right|13||align=right|6||align=right|7
|align=right|63||align=right|40||align=right|45
|Second round
|
|-
|2007
|2. divisjon
|align=right |3
|align=right|26||align=right|14||align=right|7||align=right|5
|align=right|58||align=right|28||align=right|49
|Second round
|
|-
|2008
|2. divisjon
|align=right |2
|align=right|26||align=right|16||align=right|4||align=right|6
|align=right|74||align=right|32||align=right|52
||Third round
|
|-
|2009
|2. divisjon
|align=right bgcolor=#DDFFDD| 1
|align=right|26||align=right|17||align=right|4||align=right|5
|align=right|64||align=right|21||align=right|55
|Third round
|Promoted to the 1. divisjon
|-
|2010
|1. divisjon
|align=right |5
|align=right|28||align=right|12||align=right|7||align=right|9
|align=right|38||align=right|38||align=right|43
|Quarterfinal
|Lost play-offs for promotion
|-
|2011 
|1. divisjon
|align=right |4
|align=right|30||align=right|15||align=right|7||align=right|8
|align=right|61||align=right|39||align=right|52
|Third round
|
|-
|2012 
|1. divisjon
|align=right |7
|align=right|30||align=right|11||align=right|10||align=right|9
|align=right|55||align=right|40||align=right|43
|First round
|
|-
|2013 
|1. divisjon
|align=right |4
|align=right|30||align=right|14||align=right|7||align=right|9
|align=right|49||align=right|38||align=right|49
|Fourth round
|Lost play-offs for promotion
|-
|2014 
|1. divisjon
|align=right |7
|align=right|30||align=right|13||align=right|7||align=right|10
|align=right|45||align=right|34||align=right|46
||Fourth round
|
|-
|2015 
|1. divisjon
|align=right |6
|align=right|30||align=right|13||align=right|8||align=right|9
|align=right|48||align=right|36||align=right|47
||Third round
|
|-
|2016 
|1. divisjon
|align=right |9
|align=right|30||align=right|11||align=right|6||align=right|13
|align=right|45||align=right|48||align=right|39
||Second round
|
|-
|2017 
|1. divisjon
|align=right bgcolor=#DDFFDD| 4
|align=right|30||align=right|15||align=right|7||align=right|8
|align=right|48||align=right|39||align=right|52
||Third round
|Promoted to Eliteserien through play-offs
|-
|2018
|Eliteserien
|align=right |7
|align=right|30||align=right|12||align=right|6||align=right|12
|align=right|43||align=right|50||align=right|42
||Fourth round
|
|-
|2019 
|Eliteserien
|align=right bgcolor="#FFCCCC"| 16
|align=right|30||align=right|7||align=right|6||align=right|17
|align=right|36||align=right|55||align=right|27
||Semifinal
|Relegated to 1. divisjon
|-
|2020 
|1. divisjon
|align=right |4
|align=right|30||align=right|13||align=right|8||align=right|9
|align=right|61||align=right|41||align=right|47
||Cancelled
|
|-
|2021 
|1. divisjon
|align=right |12
|align=right|30||align=right|9||align=right|7||align=right|13
|align=right|56||align=right|62||align=right|34
||Third round
|
|-
|2022
|1. divisjon
|align=right |8
|align=right|30||align=right|12||align=right|7||align=right|11
|align=right|49||align=right|52||align=right|43
||
|
|}
Source:

Head coaches
Kåre Ingebrigtsen (2006–2007)
Tore Grønning (2007–2008)
Per Joar Hansen (2008–2010)
Aasmund Bjørkan (2011–2012)
Trond Nordsteien (2013–2015)
Ola By Rise (2015)
Svein Maalen (2015–2021)
Hugo Pereira (2021–2023)
Kåre Ingebrigtsen (2023–)

References

External links

 EXTRA Arena - Nordic Stadiums

 
Football clubs in Norway
Eliteserien clubs
Sport in Trondheim
Association football clubs established in 1901
1901 establishments in Norway